Jason Ogden Buck (born July 27, 1963) is a former professional football player, a defensive lineman in the National Football League (NFL).

Football career
He played high school football for South Fremont in St. Anthony, Idaho, and college football at Brigham Young, where he won the Outland Trophy as a senior in 1986. Buck was selected in the first round of the 1987 NFL Draft by the Cincinnati Bengals, the 17th overall pick. He recorded six sacks in the 1988 season as well as in the 1989 season.  After four seasons with the Bengals, Buck moved to the Washington Redskins in 1991. He did earn a Super Bowl ring in the team's 37-24 victory over the Buffalo Bills in Super Bowl XXVI. He retired as a player following the 1993 season.

Other ventures
Buck was a co-owner of the Utah Blaze of the Arena Football League, based in Salt Lake City, Utah and is also a public speaker. He sought the Republican nomination for the 2nd District in the United States House of Representatives elections in Utah, 2012 but was defeated at the State Convention.

Personal life
He has two sons, Tyson and Josh. Tyson played linebacker for the University of Utah Utes football team in 2009-2010. Josh played long snapper for the Dixie State Red Storm in 2015.

External links
NFL.com - Jason Buck

1963 births
Living people
American athlete-politicians
All-American college football players
American football defensive ends
American football defensive tackles
BYU Cougars football players
Ricks Vikings football players
Cincinnati Bengals players
Washington Redskins players
Utah Republicans
Candidates in the 2012 United States elections
21st-century American politicians
People from Moses Lake, Washington